Shevengan (also Romanized as Shevengān; also known as Chāh-i-Shungūn) is a village in Afriz Rural District, Sedeh District, Qaen County, South Khorasan Province, Iran. At the 2006 census, its population was 108, in 28 families.

References 

Populated places in Qaen County